Bedre enn sitt rykte is a 1955 Norwegian drama film directed by Edith Carlmar, starring Vigdis Røising, Kari Nordseth, Magne Bleness and Atle Merton. The story is based on a novel by Eva Seeberg.

Dag (Bleness) is finishing school, and needs a top grade to get into medical school. He takes private lessons with the French teacher (Nordseth), and a romantic relation develops between the two. Karin (Røising) is in love with Dag, and waits for the relationship to end, while Roald (Merton) is in love with Karin.

External links
 
 Bedre enn sitt rykte at Filmweb.no (Norwegian)

1955 films
1955 drama films
Norwegian drama films
1950s Norwegian-language films
Norwegian black-and-white films